Dolenja Vas is a village in the Municipality of Ribnica in southern Slovenia. The area is part of the traditional region of Lower Carniola and is now included in the Southeast Slovenia Statistical Region.

The local parish church, built on a slight elevation in the western part of the settlement, is dedicated to Saint Roch and belongs to the Roman Catholic Archdiocese of Ljubljana. It was built in 1818. A chapel dedicated to Saint Margaret, outside the settlement to the east, is the converted surviving sanctuary of a larger 16th-century church, belonging to the same parish.

References

External links
Dolenja Vas on Geopedia

Populated places in the Municipality of Ribnica